Uzunkaya is a village in the Güzelyurt District, Aksaray Province, Turkey. Its population is 521 (2021).

References

Villages in Güzelyurt District, Aksaray